Desmella myiopitoides is a species of tephritid or fruit flies in the genus Desmella of the family Tephritidae.

Distribution
Eritrea, Zimbabwe, South Africa.

References

Tephritinae
Insects described in 1908
Taxa named by Mario Bezzi
Diptera of Africa